Mohammed Tayab Khan is a noted craftsman from Rajasthan state in India. He was awarded Padma Shri award in 2001 by Government of India for his contribution. He hails from Jodhpur.

References

External links 

Indian Muslims
Indian artisans
People from Jodhpur
Recipients of the Padma Shri in arts
Living people
Year of birth missing (living people)